Rawstudio is stand-alone application software to read and manipulate images in raw image formats from digital cameras. It is designed for working rapidly with a large volume of images, whereas similar tools are designed to work with one image at a time.

Rawstudio reads raw images from all digital camera manufacturers using dcraw as a back end. supports color management using LittleCMS to allow the user to apply color profiles (see also Linux color management).

Rawstudio uses the GTK+ user interface toolkit.

Rawstudio was available in Debian through version 7 "Wheezy", but removed from the distribution due to the software's dependency on obsolete libraries.

See also

 Darktable
 RawTherapee
 UFRaw

References

External links
 
 

Digital photography
Free graphics software
Free photo software
Free software programmed in C
Graphics software that uses GTK
Photo software for Linux
Raw image processing software